Red Kola is a carbonated soft drink made from fruit extracts, and may include flavouring from the kola nut. Red Kola is made by various firms including Currie's (operated by Dunns Food & Drinks Ltd), Solripe, and A.G. Barr.

Despite the name, it bears no resemblance to more traditional cola drinks in either flavour or appearance. It is bright red in colour and has a unique taste, significantly sharper than cola and with a strong fruit base.

Ingredients 

Currie's Red Kola: carbonated water, sugar, tartaric acid, flavourings, preservative (sodium benzoate), sweeteners (sodium saccharin, aspartame), colours (E163, E100).

Barr Red Kola: carbonated water, sugar, citric acid, flavouring, concentrates (black carrot, safflower), sweeteners (sucralose, acesulfame K), preservative (sodium benzoate).

References 

Cola
Scottish drinks